Mark A. Wright is an American politician serving as a member of the Louisiana House of Representatives from the 77th district. He assumed office on December 8, 2017.

Education 
Wright earned a Bachelor of Arts degree in political science from Xavier University of Louisiana and a dual Master of Politics–Master of Business Administration from the University of Dallas.

Career 
From 1998 to 2009, Wright worked as the vice president of the American Arbitration Association. From 2011 to 2017, he served as a member of the city council of Covington, Louisiana. Since 2009, he has worked as the vice president of American Waterways Operators, a trade association for the U.S. tugboat, towboat and barge industry. He was elected to the Louisiana House of Representatives in 2017. Wright also serves as vice chair of the House Education Committee.

References 

Living people
Xavier University of Louisiana alumni
University of Dallas alumni
Louisiana Republicans
People from Covington, Louisiana
Year of birth missing (living people)